The Sanremo Music Festival 1990 was the 40th annual Sanremo Music Festival, held at the Teatro Palafiori in Sanremo, province of Imperia, between 28 February and 3 March 1990 and broadcast on Rai 1.

The show was presented by Johnny Dorelli and Gabriella Carlucci. Adriano Aragozzini served as artistic director.

The winner of the Big Artists section was the band Pooh with the song "Uomini soli", while Mia Martini won the critics award with the song "La nevicata del '56". Marco Masini won the "Newcomers" section with the song "Disperato".

According to the rules of this edition, each song of the big artist section was presented  in a double performance by a non-Italian singer or group, and adapted in their foreign language.

Participants and results

Big Artists

Newcomers

Guests

References 

 

Sanremo Music Festival by year
1990 in Italian music 
1990 in Italian television 
1990 music festivals